Ebrahimabad-e Olya va Sofla (also Romanized as Ebrāhīmābād-e ‘Olyā va Soflá; also known as Ebrāhīmābād and Ībrāhīmābād) is a village in Kowleh Rural District, Saral District, Divandarreh County, Kurdistan Province, Iran. At the 2006 census, its population was 172, in 40 families. The village is populated by Kurds.

References 

Towns and villages in Divandarreh County
Kurdish settlements in Kurdistan Province